Luka Zahović (born 15 November 1995) is a Slovenian professional footballer who plays for Polish club Pogoń Szczecin and the Slovenia national team as a forward.

Club career

Early career
Born in Guimarães, Portugal, Zahović began his career at Spanish club Valencia before moving to Portuguese club Benfica. When Zahović was twelve years old, his family returned to Slovenia, and he joined Maribor's youth selections in the 2007–08 season after his father Zlatko became a new director of football at the club.

Maribor
He made his professional debut in the final round of the 2012–13 season during a match against Aluminij when he came on as a late substitute. In the following year he spent part of the season playing on loan at the Slovenian Second League squad Veržej, scoring three goals in ten matches, until being given more opportunities by Maribor's coach Ante Šimundža during the second part of the season, eventually making 11 appearances during the 2013–14 PrvaLiga season.

The 2014–15 was his breakthrough season. He made his PrvaLiga season debut in the second round when he came on as a late substitute in the 78th minute during a match against Radomlje. Maribor was struggling at home against the PrvaLiga newcomers with the score being 1–1 and less than ten minutes of regulation left. However, after only spending seven minutes on the pitch Zahović scored his first official goal for The Violets. He increased the lead three minutes later, securing all three points for the home side. He scored his third goal of the season in late August against Zavrč and continued his good form in early September when he netted a hat-trick for Maribor B in a match against Šentjur in the Slovenian Third League. A week later, in his fifth PrvaLiga appearance of the season, he scored another double in a match against Krka, becoming the league's top goalscorer with five goals after eight rounds.

Only four days later, on 17 September 2014, in Maribor's first match of the 2014–15 UEFA Champions League group stage at home against Sporting CP, Zahović made his debut in UEFA competitions when he came on as a substitute for Dare Vršič after Nani had put Sporting ahead in the 80th minute. He then equalised in the 92nd minute. This was only the second time, first time among Europeans, since 1992 when the UEFA Champions League was established in its current format, that a father and son have both scored in the competition. His father Zlatko has scored a total of 11 goals in 32 UEFA Champions League appearances during his career. For his performances Zahović was nominated for the 2014 Golden Boy Award. He finished the 2014–15 season in second place among the club goalscorers with 15 goals in all competitions, 12 of which he has scored in the PrvaLiga.

Heerenveen
In August 2015, Zahović moved to the Eredivisie club Heerenveen and signed a three-year deal with the Dutch squad, with the possibility of a two-year extension. The transfer fee paid by Heerenveen was undisclosed, but it is believed to have been around €700,000. Zahović earned eight appearances for the club in all competitions in the 2015–16 season.

Loan and return to Maribor
On 24 August 2016, Heerenveen loaned Zahović to Maribor. On 27 February 2017, it was reported that Zahović would not return to Heerenveen and would continue his career at Maribor. On 23 May 2017, he extended his contract with Maribor until 2020. On the same day, he was proclaimed as the best young footballer of the 2016–17 Slovenian PrvaLiga season. In the next season, Zahović became the top goalscorer of the PrvaLiga with 18 goals; all of them were scored in the second part of the season.

International career

Youth level
Zahović made his international debut in June 2010, when he played for the Slovenian under-16 team in a friendly match against Slovakia. He represented the under-17 team at the 2012 UEFA European Under-17 Championship, where he played in all three group stage matches. Zahović also scored the only goal for Slovenia in a 3–1 defeat against the Netherlands, who later won the competition. He debuted for the under-21 team on 2 June 2015 in a friendly match against Greece, where he scored Slovenia's first goal in an eventual 3–0 victory. Zahović was capped eight times for the team during the 2017 UEFA European Under-21 Championship qualifiers, and also scored one goal against Andorra in the first round.

Senior team
On 23 May 2018, Zahović was included in the senior squad for a friendly match against Montenegro. He made his debut on 16 October 2018 in a game against Cyprus.

Personal life
Zahović was born in the Portuguese city of Guimarães where his father Zlatko, a former professional footballer and the all-time top goalscorer of the Slovenia national team, was at the time playing for Vitória Guimarães. He holds both Portuguese and Slovenian citizenship.

Zahović and Maja Žnuderl have a son named Filip (born 2019).

Honours
Maribor
Slovenian PrvaLiga: 2012–13, 2013–14, 2014–15, 2016–17, 2018–19
Slovenian Cup: 2012–13
Slovenian Supercup: 2013, 2014

Notes

References

External links
NZS profile 

1995 births
Living people
Sportspeople from Guimarães
People with acquired Slovenian citizenship
Slovenian footballers
Slovenia youth international footballers
Slovenia under-21 international footballers
Slovenia international footballers
Portuguese footballers
Portuguese people of Slovenian descent
Association football forwards
Slovenian expatriate footballers
Slovenian expatriate sportspeople in the Netherlands
Expatriate footballers in the Netherlands
Slovenian expatriate sportspeople in Poland
Expatriate footballers in Poland
NK Maribor players
SC Heerenveen players
Pogoń Szczecin players
Slovenian PrvaLiga players
Slovenian Second League players
Eredivisie players
Ekstraklasa players
Portuguese people of Serbian descent 
Slovenian people of Serbian descent